In mathematics, the mapping torus in topology of a homeomorphism f of some topological space X to itself is a particular geometric construction with f. Take the cartesian product of X with a closed interval I, and glue the boundary components together by the static homeomorphism:

The result is a fiber bundle whose base is a circle and whose fiber is the original space X.  

If X is a manifold, Mf will be a manifold of dimension one higher, and it is said to "fiber over the circle".  

As a simple example, let  be the circle, and  be the inversion , then the mapping torus is the Klein bottle.  

Mapping tori of surface homeomorphisms play a key role in the theory of 3-manifolds and have been intensely studied. If S is a closed surface of genus g ≥ 2 and if f is a self-homeomorphism of S, the mapping torus Mf is a closed 3-manifold that fibers over the circle with fiber S. A deep result of Thurston states that in this case the 3-manifold Mf is hyperbolic if and only if f is a pseudo-Anosov homeomorphism of S.

References

General topology
Geometric topology
Homeomorphisms